Government Azizul Haque College in Bogura is a higher secondary school and college under the National University of Bangladesh. It is one of the largest educational institutions in Bangladesh's northern region.

History
The college was established in July 1939. It was named after Sir Azizul Haque, who was vice chancellor of Calcutta University at the time. M. M. Mukherjee was the first principal.

The college organised its first classes at Subil Free Primary School in the north side of Bogra town. Later it was transferred to Fulbari Bottola. It was initially only one small straw-shaded room. Marhum Moyen Uddin Pramanik and Marhum Rasidullah Sardar of Fulbari donated land to build the college.

With a view to setting up the college, Marhum Rajib Uddin Tarafdar, Marhum Mr. Mohammad Ali, Moulovi Osman Gani, Marhum Nawab Uddin Talukdar, Babu Naresh Chandra Tarafdar, Babu Nalin Chandra Chatterzy, and Babu Profullo Chandra Sen donated seven thousand Taka. One-third of the profits of the White-Way Circus Company Charity Show was donated to the college. Members of the first governing bodies of the college were Mohammad Ali (previous Prime Minister of Pakistan) as the chairman, Moulovi Osman Gani (editor), Habibur Rahaman (member), Doctor Mofiz Uddin (member), and Mahbubur Rahaman Chowdhury (cashier).

In 1941 the college was sanctioned by Calcutta University with the efforts of  Sir Azizul Haque, who was Education Minister of Non-Separated Bangal, Speaker of the Bengali Parliament, and Vice Chancellor of Calcutta University. In 1968 the college was recognized as a government college. The college has two residences. The original  of land is now known as the Old Residence of Azizul Haque College. Only higher secondary classes are administered there. This part of the college is known as the New Residence of Govt. Azizul Haque College.the present principal is professor Salamot Ullah.

Campus
The old residence of the college has classrooms, four laboratories, a highly developed computer lab, a library, office rooms, common rooms for girls, five buildings including a two-storey mosque, a play ground, and a three-storey residential building for male students named Fakhruddin Ahmed Hall. It is use for the student of hsc(higher secondary class) and it is the best hsc college of the city. The new residence of the college has a three-storey building for the arts and commerce group, a three-storey building for the science group, a two-storey library, a 2,500-seat auditorium, a two-storey administration building, a student parliament building, a rover scout building, laboratories, a two-storey mosque, a playground, cafeteria, post office, bank, teachers club, tennis ground, a conference room for teachers, three residential buildings for male students (Shahid Titumir Hall, Sher-E-Bangla Hall, and Akhtar Ali Moon Hall), and one residential building for female students (Begum Rokeya Hall).

Academics

Degree, Honors, and Masters classes are administered. The college offers 23 courses at the graduate level and 23 courses at the postgraduate level. Postgraduate diplomas in Information and Communication Technology (PGD in ICT) and Foreign Language Learning Courses are available.

Notable faculty
Notable faculty members of the university has included the linguist Muhammad Shahidullah and Bengali author, academician, scholar and linguist Syed Mujtaba Ali.

References

External links
 Official web site of Govt. Azizul Haque College, Bogra
 Student's discussion forum

Colleges in Bogura District
Colleges affiliated to National University, Bangladesh
1939 establishments in India
Educational institutions established in 1939
Organisations based in Bogra District